Az imposztor is a Hungarian play, written by György Spiró. It was first produced in 1983.

Plays by György Spiró
1983 plays